Malta participated in the Junior Eurovision Song Contest 2020, to be held in Warsaw, Poland. Maltese broadcaster Public Broadcasting Services (PBS) was responsible for the country's participation in the contest, and organised a national final to select the Maltese entry. Malta was represented in the contest by the song "Chasing Sunsets", written by Peter Borg, Aleandro Spiteri Monseigneur, Joe Roscoe and Emil Calleja Bayliss, and performed by Chanel Monseigneur. She achieved 8th place with 100 points.

Background

Prior to the  contest, Malta had participated in the Junior Eurovision Song Contest fifteen times since their first participation in the inaugural  contest. In the  contest, Malta was represented by the song "We Are More" performed by Eliana Gomez Blanco. The song placed last out of 19 entries with 29 points.

Before Junior Eurovision

Malta Junior Eurovision Song Contest 2020 

Malta's participation in the contest was confirmed in July 2020. PBS organised the national final Malta Junior Eurovision Song Contest 2020 to select the Maltese entry.

Competing entries 
Artists were able to submit their entries between 22 July and 23 August 2020, and the competing entries were announced on 31 August 2020. The songs were broadcast on 19 September 2020, and the show was hosted by Amber Bondin and Dorian Casar. After the show, an online vote was open until 26 September 2020. The winner was revealed on 1 October 2020.

Final

The songs were presented on 19 September 2020 at 18:15 CET. The running order was announced on 3 September 2020. The presentation consisted of pre-recorded performances of the twelve competing songs, and the winner was selected by an equal combination of jury votes and online votes from the public. The jury members in the final were: Eliana Gomez Blanco (singer, represented Malta in the Junior Eurovision Song Contest 2019), Michela Pace (singer, represented Malta in the Eurovision Song Contest 2019) and Dominic Cini (singer, composer).

Artist and song information

Chanel Monseigneur
Chanel Monseigneur (born 2 January 2011) is a Maltese singer. She represented Malta at the Junior Eurovision Song Contest 2020 with the song "Chasing Sunsets".

Chasing Sunsets
"Chasing Sunsets" is a song by Maltese singer Chanel Monseigneur. It represented Malta at the Junior Eurovision Song Contest 2020.

At Junior Eurovision
After the opening ceremony, which took place on 23 November 2020, it was announced that Malta would perform in eighth position in the final, following Georgia and preceding Russia.

Performance

Chanel Monseigneur was accompanied with a cartoon video during her performance.

Voting

Detailed voting results
Every participating country had national jury that consisted of three music industry professionals and two kids aged between 10 and 15 who were citizens of the country they represented. The rankings of those jurors were combined to make an overall top ten.

References

Junior Eurovision Song Contest
Malta
2020